Chris Harper has been the  Bishop of Saskatoon since 2018.

Harper is the first Treaty 6 priest to be ordained a bishop.. Harper was born in Paradise Hill, Saskatchewan and spent much of his younger life on Onion Lake Cree Nation. Harper was an Emergency medical technician before his call to ordination. Since then he has worked in the Dioceses of Saskatchewan, Algoma and Toronto. In December 2022, it was announced that Harper will succeed Mark MacDonald as National Indigenous Anglican Archbishop.

References

Cree people
21st-century Anglican Church of Canada bishops
Anglican bishops of Saskatoon
Emergency medical responders
Year of birth missing (living people)
Living people